On the Waterfront was an annual music festival featuring rock, country music, alternative rock, hip hop, punk rock bands, local bands, food vendors and craft booths. On the Waterfront ran on Labor Day weekend, in downtown Rockford, Illinois.

History
In 1983, during an economic downturn in Rockford due to a decline in manufacturing, city officials approved $15,000 in financing to create a celebration of the founding of Rockford to be held on Labor Day weekend. The annual On the Waterfront Festival went on to become Illinois’ largest music festival with over 100 performers in seven music venues covering 30 city blocks. The festival includes special events, attractions and venues, as well as over fifty food booths.

It appears that 2012 was the last year of this festival. Their web site (December, 2012) appears to indicate that it is no more. They explain that they can no longer financially support it and thank those who made it a success over the past 29 years.

On the Waterfront lineups by year

2012
 Theory Of A Deadman, The Offspring, Billy Currington, Phil Vassar, The Last Vegas, DJ Papo Fizz Mc

2011
Stone Temple Pilots, Buckcherry, P.O.D., Papa Roach, Puddle Of Mudd, Firehouse (band)

2010
 "Weird Al" Yankovic, Billy Idol, Hinder, Allison Iraheta & Adam Lambert, Dierks Bentley, Trombone Shorty, Candye Kane, Lil' Ed and the Blues Imperials

2009
 Jason Aldean, Jake Owen, The Nadas, Brother (Australian band), Barenaked Ladies, The Last Vegas, Framing Hanley, Red, Dot Dot Dot, Smash Mouth, Randy Bachman, The Charlie Daniels Band

2008
 Styx, Puddle of Mudd, Finger Eleven, Blue Öyster Cult, Los Lonely Boys, Whiskey Falls, Shooter Jennings

2007
 Daughtry, The Black Crowes, Shinedown, The New Cars, The Chi-Lites, 12 Stones, Kansas, Sara Evans, Little Big Town, 38 Special, Keith Anderson, Jason Michael Carroll, Blake Shelton, Blue County, The Wreckers, Cowboy Crush and Jason Aldean

2006
 Pat Benatar, Buddy Guy, Cheap Trick, Ted Nugent, Cherry Poppin' Daddies, Richard Elliot, John Lee Hooker, Jr., Buckwheat Zydeco, Reggie Sears

2005
 Alice Cooper, Cheap Trick, John Waite, Bad English, Julie Roberts, Sonny Landreth, Robert Cray and Lonnie Brooks and the Brooks Family Band

2004
 Tesla, The Allman Brothers Band, The Charlie Daniels Band, Tab Benoit, Cowboy Mouth

Culture of Rockford, Illinois
Music festivals in Illinois
Tourist attractions in Rockford, Illinois